Seuss is a surname. Notable people with the surname include:

Andy Seuss (born 1987), NASCAR racer
Diane Seuss (born 1956), American poet and educator
Dr. Seuss (Theodor Seuss "Ted" Geisel) (1904-1991), American children's author, political cartoonist, and illustrator

See also
Suess (disambiguation)